Alex Mann (born 11 November 1980) is a German bobsledder who has competed since 2007. He won two medals at the 2008 FIBT World Championships in Altenberg, Germany with a gold in the mixed team event and a bronze in the four-man event.

Mann finished seventh in the four-man event at the 2010 Winter Olympics in Vancouver.

References
 

1980 births
Bobsledders at the 2010 Winter Olympics
German male bobsledders
Living people
Olympic bobsledders of Germany